Ayayi is a surname. Notable people with the name include:

Joël Ayayi (born 2000), French-Beninese basketball player
Valériane Ayayi (born 1994), French basketball player

See also
Ajayi
Ayami
Ayari